Bhojo is a village and a railway station in the Charaideo district of the Indian state of Assam.

References

Villages in Charaideo district